The Cambridge University Boat Club (CUBC) is the rowing club of the University of Cambridge, England. The club was founded in 1828 and has been located at the Goldie Boathouse on the River Cam, Cambridge since 1882. Nowadays, training primarily takes place on the River Great Ouse at Ely.

The prime constitutional aim of CUBC is to beat Oxford University Boat Club, Oxford University Women's Boat Club, Oxford University Lightweight Rowing Club and Oxford University Women's Lightweight Rowing Club in the annual Oxford and Cambridge Boat Race and Lightweight Boat Races. CUBC's openweight men's squad currently lead OUBC in the series by 85 races to 80, with 1 dead heat in The Boat Race 1877, while the openweight women's squad lead OUWBC by 45 races to 30.  The lightweight men's squad lead OULRC by 29 races to 19, and the lightweight women's squad lead OUWLRC by 22 races to 17.

History

The inaugural meeting of Cambridge University Boat Club took place at Gonville and Caius College on 9 December 1828.  Following this meeting, it was agreed that a challenge be sent to the University of Oxford to organise a race between representatives of the two universities.  A letter was sent to Oxford in which they were challenged "to row a match at or near London, each in an eight-oared boat during the ensuing Easter vacation".  Consequently, the first Boat Race took place at Henley-on-Thames in June 1829.

The first Women's Boat Race was raced in 1927 on the Isis at Oxford, Cambridge was represented by a crew from Newnham College in front of hostile crowds. They were later joined by students from Girton College to form CUWBC for the 1941 Boat Race. CULRC was formed in 1974 to provide a lightweight crew to race OULRC in the first Lightweight Boat Race in 1975. In 1984 CUWBC fielded a lightweight women's crew for the first Lightweight Women's Boat Race at Henley. These races remained in Henley until the Women's Boat Race moved to the Championship course in London in 2015, followed by the Men's Lightweight Boat Race in 2019 and the Women's Lightweight Boat Race in 2020.

CUBC was one of five clubs which retained the right until 2012 to appoint representatives to the Council of British Rowing.  The others were Leander Club, London Rowing Club, Thames Rowing Club and Oxford University Boat Club.

On 1 August 2020, CUBC formally merged with Cambridge University Women's Boat Club and Cambridge University Lightweight Rowing Club to form a new combined club to compete against Oxford clubs in the annual boat races.  This followed a vote in April 2020 by members of all three clubs which was overwhelmingly in favour of the merger. The merger and subsequent rebrand led to a new visual identity for Cambridge University Boat Club. The new logo kept the old colours of red and black, but added yellow, the traditional team kit colour of the men’s and women’s reserve crews, Goldie and Blondie.

Notability

CUBC has produced numerous Olympic-level rowers in its history. During the Boat Race period both the Men's Blue Boat and Goldie crews boat from King's College School's Boat House on the Putney embankment while the Women's Blue Boat and Blondie crews boat from Thames Rowing Club. During the Lightweight Boat Race period, CUBC Lightweight Men boat from London Rowing Club and Lightweight Women boat from Thames Rowing Club.

Honours

British champions

Key = 2, 4, 8 (crew size), x (sculls), - (coxless), + (coxed)

Henley Royal Regatta

Gallery

References
Notes

Bibliography

Sports clubs established in the 1820s
 
1828 establishments in England
University and college rowing clubs in the United Kingdom
The Boat Race
Sports organizations established in 1828
Rowing clubs in Cambridgeshire
Rowing clubs of the River Cam
Rowing clubs of the River Great Ouse